Equinet is the European Network of Equality Bodies. It serves as a professional platform for cooperation, capacity building and peer support amongst Equality Bodies around the legal interpretation and implementation in practice of the EU equal treatment Directives and around the promotion of equality and the elimination of discrimination.

National Equality Bodies have been established on the basis of the EU equal treatment Directives. This legislation provides that each Member State shall have (at least) one Equality Body with the power to, among other, give independent assistance to victims of discrimination. The Equality Bodies are specialised authorities whose staff are trained and experienced to handle cases of discrimination. They are empowered to counteract discrimination across the range of grounds including age, disability, gender, race or ethnic origin, religion or belief, and sexual orientation. 

Equinet is an umbrella organisation for European equality bodies and has no mandate to provide any kind of legal assistance to individual victims of discrimination. The organisation however provides contact details (see below) for equality bodies based in all EU Member States and beyond.

History
Equinet builds upon the two-year project "Strengthening the co-operation between specialised bodies for the implementation of equal treatment legislation" (2002-2004).   The initiative to create a network of equality bodies was taken by the Migration Policy Group, who also acted as Equinet's Secretariat until 2007.  Equinet was established as an independent structure in 2007 with the creation of the Equinet Secretariat in Brussels and its registration as a not-for-profit international association (AISBL) under Belgian law.

Mission and Objectives
Equinet promotes equality in Europe by supporting Equality Bodies to be independent and effective catalysts for more equal societies, and delivers its mission in a way that embodies and promotes its values.   Equinet works to:

 Strengthen and support Equality Bodies to achieve equality for all 
 Act as an expert voice of Equality Bodies in Europe on equality and non-discrimination  
 Maintain and improve Equinet’s capacity as a strong, resilient, and innovative Network

Approach 
Support & Empower - Equinet provides general support to Equality Bodies through capacity building activities, facilitates peer-to-peer exchange and knowledge sharing across Equality Bodies, promotes and consolidates Equality Bodies’ position as national level experts on equality and non-discrimination, including by supporting the adoption and implementation of legislation on European Standards for Equality Bodies.

Connect & Network - Equinet builds bridges between Equality Bodies and partners (policymakers, civil society organisations, European institutions, etc.) as well as other actors related to equality and non-discrimination, provides a forum for Equality Bodies to network, and creates useful connections at European level.

Innovate & Disseminate - Equinet acts as a research & knowledge Hub, creating new knowledge on innovative issues related to nondiscrimination and equality, as well as disseminating this knowledge among Equality Bodies and other stakeholders.

Catalyse & Strengthen – Equinet stimulates expert and informed reflection on the situation of equality and non-discrimination in Europe, strengthening the European equality framework, channelling the learnings and voices of Equality Bodies in European discussions, consultations and legislative processes. For example, Equinet submits expert third party interventions to international courts, as in the Toplak and Mrak v. Slovenia ECtHR case.

Standards for Equality Bodies 
The current provisions on equality bodies leave a large discretion to the Member States as to the mandate, powers, independence, effectiveness, and resources of these bodies. Differences between the Member States in the structure and functioning of equality bodies result in unequal protection against discrimination across the EU. There are still gaps in the protection for some grounds and/or some fields in around a third of Member States. Furthermore, a significant number of equality bodies are not fully independent from the government and the lack of resources prevent them from fulfilling their missions, such as conducting surveys.

2018 saw remarkable developments on standards for equality bodies, both at European Commission and Council of Europe level. These standards acknowledge and respond to the full diversity and complexity of equality bodies, with diverse types of mandates, sets of functions and competences and range of grounds covered being addressed.

European Commission: Recommendation on Standards for Equality Bodies 
The European Commission adopted a Recommendation on standards for equality bodies in June 2018, in order to ensure the independence and effectiveness of national equality bodies. The Recommendation, a legal act of the commission, sets minimum standards concerning the mandate of equality bodies; their independence; their effectiveness, including sufficient resources and appropriate powers; and the national institutional architecture for equality.

ECRI: Revised General Policy Recommendation No.2 on Equality bodies to combat racism and intolerance at national level 
The Revised GPR No.2, General Policy Recommendation on Equality bodies to combat racism and intolerance at national level, was adopted at ECRI's 74th plenary meeting in December 2017. It addresses the establishment of equality bodies, the institutional architecture of equality bodies, their functions and competences and their independence, effectiveness and accessibility.

This standard will be implemented as part of the country monitoring by ECRI and the constructive dialogue between ECRI and the Council of Europe member states.

Proposed Legislative Initiative - Equality Bodies: Binding Standards
Following the EU Anti-racism Action Plan and the LGBTIQ+ and Roma Equality Strategies, in which the Commission raised the possibility of proposing EU-level legislation to strengthen the role and independence of equality bodies, in 2021, the Commission launched a new initiative through which it intends to strengthen equality bodies by setting minimum standards on how they operate in all grounds of discrimination and areas covered by EU equality rules. For updates on the standards process, see the Equinet webpage dedicated to standards for equality bodies

Members
Most Equinet members belong to the European Union, while nine equality bodies come from outside the European Union (Albania, Bosnia and Herzegovina, Georgia, Kosovo*, Macedonia, Moldova, Montenegro, Norway and Serbia).

This designation is without prejudice to positions on status, and is in line with UNSCR 1244/1999 and the ICJ Opinion on the Kosovo declaration of independence.

Organizational structure

Governance

General Assembly of Members

The main decisions concerning the general direction of Equinet are taken by the General Assembly of Members. This assembly is made up of all the members of the network and is convened at least once a year for an annual general meeting (AGM). The General Assembly has the power to approve new members and, following a nomination process by members, to vote for representatives on the Executive Board etc.

Executive Board

Management and administration of the network is delegated to the Executive Board. The Board is also responsible for the preparation and implementation of the AGM's decisions. Executive Board Members, the advisor to the Board and the treasurer receive no salary for their input.

Working Groups

Working groups are composed of staff from member organisations and led by a moderator. Working groups are the main medium for the sharing of expertise between different equality bodies. There were five Equinet Working Groups in 2019:
Equality Law in Practice – supporting equality bodies in their legal work 
Gender Equality – supporting the effective promotion of gender equality and the combat against gender discrimination by equality bodies
Communication Strategies and Practices – supporting equality bodies in their communication work
Policy Formation – supporting a dialogue on the learning from the work of equality bodies
Research and Data Collection - supporting the use and collection of data on complaints

The Secretariat

The Secretariat reports to the Executive Board and implements the annual work plan of the organisation. It is responsible for the daily activities of the network and assists individual members with their requests. It assists and coordinates the work of the Working Groups. There are 9 employees working at the Equinet secretariat.

Financing
Equinet has two key sources of income: 
Grant of the European Commission under Citizens, Equality, Rights and Values Programme of the European Union 
Membership fees

References

Egalitarianism